Barkeria skinneri is a species of orchid native to Guatemala and Chiapas.

References

skinneri
Flora of Chiapas
Flora of Guatemala
Orchids of Mexico
Orchids of Central America
Plants described in 1844